Daniel William Conn (born 14 February 1986) is an Australian model and former professional rugby league footballer.

He has also appeared on Geordie Shore Season 6 as the personal trainer. Dan had a romance with Vicky Pattison and also appeared alongside her in season 1 of Ex on the Beach.

Playing career
A Wellington Cowboys & St Johns Dubbo junior, Conn played for the Canterbury Bulldogs and Gold Coast Titans.

The Sydney Roosters signed Conn in 2010. In 2011 he was forced to retire at age 25 due to spinal cord injuries.

Controversies

Michael Weyman incident
In round 4, 2008, while playing for the Gold Coast Titans Conn vigorously tackled then-Canberra Raiders forward Michael Weyman with a swinging arm. Weyman reacted poorly and threw punches after the play the ball, breaking Conn's nose. Conn was forced off the field through the blood rule, and Weyman was sent off and banned for six matches.

The two went head to head again in the 2010 NRL Grand Final when Conn, playing for the Sydney Roosters, was booked for a high shot on the then-Dragons forward. The Roosters lost the Grand Final 32–8.

Painkiller prescription fraud
In 2008 Conn was castigated by a magistrate, fined $5000 and ordered to do community service after admitting to faking painkiller prescriptions. The court was told he was charged after presenting a bogus prescription for the drugs Valium and Tramal at a Gold Coast pharmacy. Suspicious pharmacy staff contacted the doctor noted on the prescription who said the document was false. The pharmacist refused to fill the script and alerted police.

Police prosecutor Mark Williams said investigations revealed Conn, who refused to be interviewed by police, had presented another false prescription to the same pharmacy the previous year.

Retirement
In Round 12 of the 2011 NRL season, Conn received a major neck injury which needed major surgery to have his spine fused. A week later he was told that there was a high possibility that if he continued with his career that he may not see the future. Even though he retired at the age of 25, he believed it was the best choice.

Daniel Conn starred in series 6 of Geordie Shore where the gang travelled to Australia, he was dating Geordie Shore housemate Vicky Pattison and was known as 'Fit Dan' on the show. He has also appeared on the reality TV show Ex On The Beach, where he is introduced as Vicky Pattison's ex.

References

External links

NRL Official Profile

1986 births
Australian rugby league players
Australian people of Greek descent
Australian people of Māori descent
Canterbury-Bankstown Bulldogs players
Gold Coast Titans players
Sydney Roosters players
Newtown Jets NSW Cup players
Rugby league locks
Rugby league second-rows
Living people
Rugby league players from New South Wales